The 21st Special Tactics Squadron is one of the special tactics units of the United States Air Force Special Operations Command. It is garrisoned at Pope Field, North Carolina.

Mission
Special Tactics Squadrons are organized, trained and equipped specifically for various special operations missions facilitating air operations on the battlefield. They conduct combat search and rescue missions, collect intelligence, as well as call in close air support or airstrikes against enemy combatants and are often partnered with other U.S. special operations forces overseas.

Lineage
 Designated as the 1721st Combat Control Squadron and activated on 1 July 1984
 Redesignated 624th Combat Control Squadron on 1 June 1992
 Inactivated 1 October 1993
 Redesignated 21st Special Tactics Squadron on 1 May 1996 and activated

Assignments
Twenty-First Air Force, 1 July 1984
1725th Combat Control Group, 1 March 1991
624th Airlift Support Group, 1 June 1992 – 1 October 1993
720th Special Tactics Group, 1 May 1996 – present

Stations
Pope Air Force Base, North Carolina , 1 July 1984 – 1 October 1993
 Pope Air Force Base (later Pope Field), 1 May 1996 – present

Awards and campaigns

Notable members

Senior Airman Zachary Rhyner, a Combat Controller, was the first living recipient of the Air Force Cross in the Global War on Terror. He was awarded the Air Force Cross for his actions during the Battle of Shok Valley on 6 April 2008 in Nuristan Province, Afghanistan. According to the citation, during the battle he directed Close air support and Airstrikes totalling 4,570 cannon rounds, nine Hellfire missiles, 162 rockets, a dozen 500-pound bombs and one 2,000-pound bomb. As a result of the same battle ten U.S. Army soldiers, nine Special Forces and one Combat Cameraman, received the Silver Star.
September 20, 2011 21st Special Tactics Squadron Combat Controller Staff Sgt. Robert Gutierrez received the Air Force Cross for extraordinary heroism. On October 5, 2009 Gutierrez was embedded in a joint US/Afghan National Army Special Forces 30 man unit as the only qualified joint terminal attack controller on a mission in Afghanistan when the unit came under intense enemy fire. Despite being shot, Gutierrez called in three danger close air strikes on the enemy.
Senior Airman Dustin Temple, a Combat Controller, received the Air Force Cross for his actions during a 48-hour battle September 27–29, 2014 against Taliban forces in the Kajaki district of Helmand province. He was attached to U.S. Army Special Forces team from the 7th Special Forces Group with two other 21st STS members and accompanied by Afghan commandos. Temple called in dozens of airstrikes from various aircraft, among them, F-16s, AH-1s, AC-130s and an MQ-1. Over the course of the battle he controlled 28 helicopters and 20 fixed wing aircraft in a total of 26 engagements. After 45 hours of fighting a resupply helicopter dropped critically needed ammunition to the U.S. and Afghan forces. Temple and two other teammates braved enemy fire across open terrain multiple times to recover the ammunition. The Army team-leader Captain Evan Lacenski carried a critically wounded Green Beret over 300 meters in open terrain to the MEDEVAC helicopter. He was credited with saving 80 lives as a result of his actions. Along with Temple receiving the Air Force Cross, the other two STS members received the Silver Star for their actions during the battle.

References

Notes

Bibliography

Military units and formations in North Carolina
021